Janko Veber (born 30 July 1960 in Ljubljana) is a Slovenian politician.

Veber studied civil engineering at the University of Ljubljana. Then he moved to Kočevje, where he was elected mayor and served three terms, from 1994 to 2010. In 1996, he was elected member of the National Assembly as a member of Social Democrats.

In February 2013, Veber was elected Speaker of the National Assembly, following the resignation of Gregor Virant from this position earlier in January. After the 2014 elections, he became Minister of Defence.

References

1960 births
Living people
Presidents of the National Assembly (Slovenia)
People from Kočevje
Social Democrats (Slovenia) politicians
University of Ljubljana alumni
Mayors of places in Slovenia
Defence ministers of Slovenia